Jocotitlán, also known as Xocotépetl, is a volcano in the Jocotitlán and Atlacomulco municipalities, in the State of Mexico.

Jocotitlán volcano lies in the northern part of the Toluca Valley. It is part of the Eje Neovolcánico, a volcanic belt that traverses south-central Mexico. It is a stratovolcano formed by tephra and solidified lava flows. The volcano lies within the Isidro Fabela state park, a protected area of 3701 ha established in 1975.

Jocotitlán was considered holy by the Mazahua and Otomi peoples. The former called it Nguemore ("sacred mountain"), while the latter called it Gumidi ("he who sits facing straight forward"). In Pre-Columbian Mexico, the volcano held a sanctuary for Otontecuhtli, the Otomi king of the gods, also known to the Nahua people as fire god Xiuhtecuhtli. The volcano has also held a Catholic chapel since the 1980s. At , it is probably one of the highest chapels in Mexico.

Jocotitlán is a potentially active volcano, having erupted at least twice in the last 10,000 years. A series of cinder cones lying just north of the Jocotitlán volcano shows how intense the volcanic activity in the region is. If it erupts, the volcano could pose a serious threat to Greater Toluca and even Greater Mexico City.

The volcano can be easily climbed from the town of Jocotitlán. A winding 19 km country lane leads up to the microwave antenna located near the summit.

Notes

External links

References

Sacred mountains
Active volcanoes
Mountains of Mexico
Stratovolcanoes of Mexico
Trans-Mexican Volcanic Belt
Landforms of the State of Mexico
Geography of Mesoamerica
Locations in Aztec mythology
Locations in Mesoamerican mythology
North American 3000 m summits
Volcanoes of the State of Mexico
Pleistocene stratovolcanoes
Holocene stratovolcanoes